Forty-Five Minutes From Broadway is a three-act musical by George M. Cohan written about New Rochelle, New York. The title refers to the 45-minute train ride from New Rochelle to Broadway.

The musical debuted on January 1, 1906 at the New Amsterdam Theatre on Broadway and ran for 90 performances before closing on March 17. The role of Mary Jane Jenkins was created by Fay Templeton and Kid Burns was played by Victor Moore.  The musical re-opened later the same year, on November 5, at the New York Theatre with the cast almost unchanged.  It played there for an additional 32 performances before closing on December 1.  Its only Broadway revival after that was from March 14 to April 13, 1912 at George M. Cohan's Theatre, where it ran for 36 performances with a different cast.

The piece is remembered for several songs, such as its title song, "Forty-five Minutes from Broadway", originally sung by Moore, and for tunes about its leading lady character, "Mary Is a Grand Old Name" and "So Long Mary", both sung in the original production by Templeton, which were performed in recreations of the original stage play within the 1942 film Yankee Doodle Dandy.

Lyrics excerpts

Forty-five Minutes from Broadway
Only forty-five minutes from Broadway
Think of the changes it brings
For the short time it takes
What a diff'rence it makes 
In the ways of the people and things
Oh, what a fine bunch of reubens
Oh, what a jay atmosphere
They have whiskers like hay
And imagine Broadway
Only forty-five minutes from here

Mary Is a Grand Old Name
For it is Mary; Mary
Plain as any name can be
But with propriety, society
Will say, "Marie"
But it was Mary; Mary
Long before the fashions came
And there is something there
That sounds so square
It's a grand old name

So Long Mary
Mary: It's awfully nice of all you boys to see me to the train
Chorus: So long, Mary
Mary: I didn't think you'd care if you should ne'er see me again
Chorus: You're wrong, Mary
Mary: This reminds me of my family / On the day I left Schenectady
Chorus: So long, Mary / Don't forget to come back home

As staged in the film Yankee Doodle Dandy (1942), starring James Cagney, this sentimental song is lightened by a scene in which her luggage springs open. Her male admirers politely gather her bloomers and petticoats, and repack for the blushing Mary, while they continue singing.

Footnotes

External links
Billy Murray sings "Forty-Five Minutes from Broadway

1906 musicals
Broadway musicals
Culture of New Rochelle, New York
Musicals by George M. Cohan